Ligue 2 (League 2), also known as Ligue 2 BKT due to sponsorship by Balkrishna Industries, is a French professional football league. The league serves as the second division of French football and is one of two divisions making up the Ligue de Football Professionnel (LFP), the other being Ligue 1, the country's top football division. Contested by 20 clubs, it operates on a system of promotion and relegation with both Ligue 1 and the third division Championnat National. Seasons run from August to May, with teams playing 38 games each, totalling 380 games in the season. Most games are played on Fridays and Mondays, with a few games played during weekday and weekend evenings. Play is regularly suspended the last weekend before Christmas for two weeks before returning in the second week of January.

Ligue 2 was founded a year after the creation of the first division in 1933 under the name Division 2 and has served as the second division of French football ever since. The name lasted until 2002 before switching to its current name. Since the league is a part of the LFP, it allows clubs who are on the brink of professionalism to become so. However, if a club suffers relegation to the Championnat National, its professional status can be revoked temporarily until they return to Ligue 2.

History 
The second division of French football was established in 1933, one year after the creation of the all-professional first division. The inaugural season of the competition consisted of the six clubs who were relegated following the 1932–33 National season, as well as many of the clubs who opposed the creation of the first division the previous season. Clubs such as Strasbourg, RC Roubaix, and Amiens SC all played in the second division's debut season despite having prior grievances with the subjective criteria needed to become professional and play in the first division. The first year of the second division consisted of twenty-three clubs and were divided into two groups (Nord and Sud). Fourteen of the clubs were inserted into the Nord section, while the remaining nine were placed in Sud. Following the season, the winner of each group faced each other to determine which club would earn promotion. On 20 May 1934, the winner of the Nord group, Red Star Saint-Ouen, faced Olympique Alès, the winner of the Sud group. Red Star were crowned the league's inaugural champions following a 3–2 victory. Despite losing, Alès was also promoted to the first division and they were followed by Strasbourg and Mulhouse, who each won a pool championship, after the first division agreed to expand its teams to 16.

Due to several clubs merging, folding, or losing their professional status, the federation turned the second division into a 16-team league and adopted the single-table method for the 1934–35 season. Due to the unpredictable nature of French football clubs, the following season, the league increased to 19 clubs and, two years later, increased its allotment to 25 teams with the clubs being divided into four groups. Because of World War II, football was suspended by the French government and the Ligue de Football Professionnel. Following the end of the war, the second division developed stability. Due to the increase in amateur clubs, the league intertwined professional and amateur clubs and allowed the latter to become professional if they met certain benchmarks. In 2002, the league changed its name from Division 2 to Ligue 2.

In November 2014, the presidents of Caen and Nîmes were amongst several arrested on suspicion of match fixing. The arrests followed a 1–1 draw between Caen and Nîmes in May 2014, a result very beneficial for each club.

Competition format
There are 20 clubs in Ligue 2. During the course of a season, usually from August to May, each club plays the others twice, once at their home stadium and once at that of their opponents, for a total of 38 games. Teams receive three points for a win and one point for a draw. No points are awarded for a loss. Teams are ranked by total points, then goal difference, and then goals scored. At the end of each season, the club with the most points is crowned champion and promoted to Ligue 1. If points are equal, the goal difference and then goals scored determine the winner. If still equal, teams are deemed to occupy the same position. If there is a tie for the championship or for relegation, a play-off match at a neutral venue decides rank. The second-place finisher are also promoted to the first division. The fourth and fifth-place finishers play a one leg fixture at the fourth-place finisher's stadium, the winner of this fixture faces the third-place finisher at the third-place finisher's stadium, the winner of this fixture plays the 18th-placed team in Ligue 1 for the right to play in Ligue 1 the following season. The three lowest placed teams are relegated to the Championnat National and the top three teams from National are promoted in their place. While a decision was originally made that during the 2015–16 season only the best two teams would be promoted to Ligue 1 and the last two teams would be relegated to the National, that decision was later overturned by an appeal to the Conseil d'État and the French Football Federation.

In December 2021, the majority of LFP member clubs, including Championnat National club leaders, voted to contract Ligue 2 from 20 to 18 clubs for the 2024–25 season. This will happen one year after Ligue 1 itself drops from 20 to 18 teams for the 2023-24 season. The plan is for Ligue 2 to relegate four clubs to, and promote two from, National at the end of 2023–24.

Ligue 2 members (2022–23 season)

Previous winners

Notes:
AS Nancy Lorraine is not the successor to FC Nancy.
Toulouse FC is not the successor to Toulouse FC (1937).

Top goalscorers

Records 
 5 minutes: the time it took Angelo Fulgini (Valenciennes, 2016–17 season) to score the fastest hat trick in the history of Ligue 2.
 5 times: the number of times Le Havre and Nancy won the second division championship. 
 Number of points won by a team in a single season, without achieving promotion to Ligue 1: 
77 points (1994–95 season) or 1.833 points per game (42 games) for Toulouse.
72 points (1995–96 season, 22 teams involved): or 1.71 points per game for Laval.
71 points (2018–19 season, 20 teams involved): or 1.868 points per game for Troyes.
70 points (2020–21 season, 20 teams involved): or 1.84 points per game for Toulouse.
52 points (curtailed 2019–20 season, 20 teams involved) or 1.857 points per game (28 games) for Ajaccio.
 128 goals: The number of goals scored in 40 games (a single season) by Angers in 40 games, (1968–69 season).
 55 goals: the number of goals scored in a season by Gerard Grizzetti, forward playing for Angoulême (1969).
 41 seasons: Number of seasons played by the Besançon and Cannes.
 The fastest goal in the history of Ligue 2 was marked on 26 September 2009 by Rémi Maréval against Nîmes. After eight seconds of play, the ball crossed the goal line of Nicolas Puydebois.

Broadcaster

France

International

Sponsorship names
 Ligue 2 Domino's Pizza (2016–2020)
 Ligue 2 BKT (2020–present)

Notes

References

External links

  
  
  League321.com – French football league tables, records & statistics database.

 
2
1933 establishments in France
France
Sports leagues established in 1933
Professional sports leagues in France